Louise McWhirter (October 19, 1896 – November 1, 1957) was a financial astrologer who purported to use astrology to forecast the financial markets. In 1937, she published her only book, Astrology and Stock Market Forecasting. Some believe that “Louise McWhirter” was only an alias of famous market forecaster W. D. Gann.

McWhirter’s theory

The Nodal cycle 

McWhirter's main theory was that the major of primary trend of business volume and finance is clearly pointed out by the 18.6-year cycle of the North Node as it passes through the twelve signs of the zodiac. During a long-term trend, the four crucial points of the stock market are reached when the Node enters the four fixed signs respectively:

 Aquarius: This is the extreme low of business activity, the bottom of the cycle.
 Pisces: The business activity approaches the bottom of the cycle.
 Aries: The business activity starts to fall below the normal level.
 Taurus: The business activity reaches a normal level, but the trend is going down.
 Gemini: The business continues to fall lower towards the normal level.
 Cancer: The business activity fades from the top.
 Leo: This is the extreme high of business activity, the top of the cycle.
 Virgo: The business activity goes even higher.
 Libra: The business activity starts to go above the normal level.
 Scorpio: The business activity reaches a normal level, and the trend is going up.
 Sagittarius: The business continues to go higher towards the normal level.
 Capricorn: The business activity turns up from the bottom.

It has been noted that the four crucial signs (the top, bottom and two break-even points) correspond to the four heads of the cherubim in the Book of Ezekiel.

Below is a table of stock market crashes and the respective North Node locations. Please note that the motion of the North is retrograde by default, so that it always travels from West to East, in the opposite way of other planets.

Aspects and positions of major planets 

McWhirter also lists several secondary factors which tend to raise or depress business, mostly related to aspects of major planets like Jupiter, Saturn, Uranus, Neptune and Pluto:

The NYSE natal chart 
McWhirter maintained that one should pay attention when a planet moves to 14° Cancer (104°) and 24° Pisces (354°), because these places are where the Ascendant and Midheaven were when the New York Stock Exchange (NYSE) was initiated by an agreement on 17 May 1792, though only after rectifying the exact time to 7:52 am. Similarly, since the tenth house of the NYSE chart was in Pisces and Aries, which are ruled by Neptune and Mars respectively, she also thought that aspects to these two planets are important.

New moon analysis 
In a shorter timeframe, McWhirter uses the new moon for timing market turns. The key idea is that she would pay attention to planets which make an astrological aspect to the new moon, and watch them as the moon passes through them later.

Comparison with W. D. Gann

Identity suspicion 
M. G. Bucholtz suspects that “Louise McWhirter” is not the author's real name. His reason is that he comes across no other books by McWhirter and finds no other sources mentioning this person. He believes that the real identity of Louise McWhirter was famous market forecaster W. D. Gann, whom Bucholtz believes used similar techniques in market predictions. According to Pythagorean numerology, the names “W. D. Gann” and “Louise McWhirter” share the same numerological root of “9”. It is possibly not an coincidence, since some people believe that Gann was an numerologist.

Gann’s financial timetable 
One of the biggest connection between McWhirter and Gann is that McWhirter's Nodal cycle theory is very similar to Gann's “financial timetable”. It is timetable with alternating 18- and 19-year cycle, which mimics the Nodal cycle very closely. Like McWhirter's theory, Gann also found that the stock market follows a rhythm of 18–19 years. Here is a modernised example of the table:

References 

1896 births
1957 deaths
20th-century astrologers